Kasem Sejdini was an Albanian politician and mayor of Elbasan from 1919 through 1924.

References

Year of birth missing
Year of death missing
Mayors of Elbasan